Diangassagou (also spelled Diemessogou; locally pronounced Jèmè-sùgû:) is a village and seat of the commune of Timniri in the Cercle of Bandiagara of the Mopti Region of southern-central Mali.

Dianggassagou consists of a compact village cluster located on a plateau. An old iron ore quarry is located in the vicinity of Dianggassagou. Tomo Kan is spoken in the village of Dianggassagou. Local surnames are Minta, Sanafo, Toulema, and Pamatek.

References

Populated places in Mopti Region